Stephen Okai (born 27 September 1989) is a former Ghanaian footballer and current coach.

Career

College & Amateur
Okai played four years of college soccer at the University of Mobile. Okai won the National Player of the Year award in NAIA and was a three-time All-American.

During his time at college, Okai also played for USL PDL club Des Moines Menace in 2010, and Reading United A.C. in 2011 and 2012.

Professional career
On January 17, 2013, Okai was selected 31st overall in the 2013 MLS SuperDraft by Philadelphia Union. He trialed with the club, but was released by Philadelphia on February 22, 2013.

Okai signed with USL Pro club Charlotte Eagles in April 2013. He made his pro debut on April 13, 2013, in a 2–0 victory over Antigua Barracuda FC.

Okai signed with USL Pro side Pittsburgh Riverhounds in January 2015. On November 30, 2017, the club announced that Okai's contract had expired. He departed Pittsburgh after three seasons with the Riverhounds and retired.

Coaching career
On 18 May 2018, Okai joined the coaching staff for the Riverhounds Development Academy.

References

1989 births
Living people
Ghanaian footballers
Ghanaian expatriate footballers
Des Moines Menace players
Reading United A.C. players
Charlotte Eagles players
Orange County SC players
Pittsburgh Riverhounds SC players
Expatriate soccer players in the United States
Philadelphia Union draft picks
USL League Two players
USL Championship players
Association football midfielders